"The Greatest" is a song by American rapper Rod Wave, released on April 1, 2020, as the fifth single from his second studio album Pray 4 Love (2020).

Composition
In the song, Rod Wave reflects on his struggles in the past, and celebrates his newfound fame. He transitions to his melodic singing voice in the bridge, in which he sings about brighter days coming in his life, and the outro, in which he touches on the impact of his music on his fans.

Music video
The music video was directed by All The Smoke. It contains footage of Rod Wave performing at a concert and interacting with fans.

Charts

Certifications

References

2020 singles
2020 songs
Rod Wave songs
Songs written by Rod Wave